This list of fictional canines is subsidiary to the list of fictional animals and is a collection of various notable canine characters that appear in various works of fiction. It is limited to well-referenced examples of canines. These lists are for all canines except dogs, including coyotes, jackals, foxes, and wolves. Hyenas are not canines.  Fantasy beasts like Werewolves are excluded. Dogs can be found in List of fictional dogs. Wolves can be found in List of fictional wolves. Foxes can be found in List of fictional foxes.

Literature

Comics

Television

Animation

Video games

Other performing arts

Animatronics
 Dook LaRue, a drum-playing dog from The Rock-afire Explosion at Showbiz Pizza Place.
 Jasper T. Jowls, a guitar-playing (former banjo) playing hound dog from Chuck E. Cheese's.
 Foxy Colleen, a female Irish fox who was a guest star at Chuck E. Cheese's during its Pizza Time Theatre days.
 Harmony Howlette, a female coyote who was a guest star at Chuck E. Cheese's during its Pizza Time Theatre days.
 The Beagles, a group of beagles from Chuck E. Cheese's Pizza Time Theatre who would sing archived songs from their namesake, The Beatles.
 The Beach Bowzers, a group of dogs from Chuck E. Cheese's Pizza Time Theatre who would sing archived songs from The Beach Boys. Their animatronics were modified from the Beagles.

References